Chumeh may refer to:
 Chumeh Karan
 Chumeh Tupchi Masjid 
 Chumeh-ye Khazaliyeh
 Chumeh-ye Kuchak
 Chumeh-ye Seyyed Alvan